David Bugozi Musuguri (born 4 January 1920) is a Tanzanian soldier and retired military officer who served as Chief of the Tanzania People's Defence Force from 1980 until 1988.

Biography

Early life 
David Musuguri was born on 4 January 1920 in Butiama, Tanganyika. In 1938, he underwent bhakisero, a traditional rite of passage for Zanaki males involving the filing of the top incisors into triangular shapes.

Military career 
In 1942, Musugiri enlisted in the King's African Rifles (KAR), beginning as a private. He later served with the KAR in Madagascar. By 1947 he was a sergeant and acted as an instructor at Kahawa Barracks in Nairobi, Kenya. While there he met future Ugandan dictator Idi Amin, who was a pupil of his. In 1957, the British administration introduced the rank of effendi into the KAR, which was awarded to high performing African non-commissioned officers and warrant officers (it was not a true officer classification). Musuguri was given the rank. In December 1961, Tanganyika became a sovereign state and several units of the KAR was transferred to the newly formed Tanganyika Rifles. The rank of effendi was shortly thereafter abandoned, and, by 1962, Musuguri had been promoted to lieutenant. During the Tanganyika Rifles mutiny of January 1964, Musuguri was stationed in Tabora. Rebellious troops, attempting to remove and replace their British officers, declared him a major.

Though reportedly illiterate, Musuguri eventually rose to the rank of brigadier by 1978. In early 1979, he was promoted to major general and given command of the Tanzanian People's Defence Force (TPDF)'s 20th Division, a force that had been assembled to invade Uganda following the outbreak of the Uganda–Tanzania War in 1978. During the war, he garnered the nom de guerre "General Mutukula", and successfully commanded his forces during the battles of Simba Hills, Masaka, and Lukaya, as well as Operation Dada Idi. Over the course of the conflict he took charge of over a dozen Ugandan orphans and oversaw their care until they could be turned over to relatives.

In early November 1980, Musuguri was appointed Chief of the TPDF. He returned to Tanzania the following week to take up his new post. On 30 December, President Julius Nyerere promoted him to lieutenant general. On 7 February 1981, Ugandan President Milton Obote gave Musuguri two spears in honor of "his gallant action in the Battle of Lukaya". During his tenure, he was accused of encouraging ethnic favoritism in the armed forces. He was opposed to withdrawing Tanzanian troops from Uganda in 1981 on the grounds that the country had not yet built a reliable armed force, but Nyerere overruled him. His retirement was announced on 31 August 1988.

Later life 
Following his retirement, Musuguri moved to Butiama. In 2002, he endorsed the creation of an East African federation between Tanzania, Uganda, and Kenya. In 2014, he was awarded the Order of the Union Third Class by President Jakaya Kikwete. On 4 January 2020, he celebrated his 100th birthday.

Notes

Citations

References 

 
 
 
 
 

Living people
1920 births
Tanzanian generals
Military personnel of the Uganda–Tanzania War
Tanzanian centenarians
Men centenarians
British Army personnel of World War II
Expatriates in Madagascar